John French (born 22 December 1955) is a British speed skater. He competed in two events at the 1980 Winter Olympics.

References

External links
 

1955 births
Living people
British male speed skaters
Olympic speed skaters of Great Britain
Speed skaters at the 1980 Winter Olympics
Sportspeople from Peterborough